Manuel Villa Campos (born March 24, 1889 - death date unknown) was a Cuban baseball second baseman and outfielder in the Cuban League and the Negro leagues. He played from 1907 to 1922 with several ballclubs, including Almendares, Matanzas, Club Fé, Carmelita, the Habana club, the All Cubans, and the Cuban Stars (West). He was elected to the Cuban Baseball Hall of Fame in 1949.

External links
 and Baseball-Reference Black Baseball stats and Seamheads

1889 births
Year of death missing
Baseball players from Havana
Cuban League players
Almendares (baseball) players
Club Fé players
Cuban Stars (West) players
Habana players
Matanzas players
Carmelita players
All Cubans players